Hydissus or Hydissos, Hydisus or Hydisos (Ὑδισός), or Hydissa (Ὕδισσα) was a town of ancient Caria, situated east of Mylassa. Hydissus was a polis (city-state) and a member of the Delian League.
 
Its site is located near Karacahisar, Muğla Province, Turkey.

References

Populated places in ancient Caria
Former populated places in Turkey
Greek city-states
Members of the Delian League
Milas District
History of Muğla Province